Sree Narayana Gurukulam College of Engineering was established in 2002 by Kunnathunadu S.N.D.P Union. It is named after Sree Narayana Guru (1855–1928).

Campus 
The campus occupies 40 acres in the outskirts of Kochi. The college is 4 km north of Kolenchery and 14 km south of Perumbavoor on the Kolenchery - Perumbavoor road. The college is housed in its permanent location and has a constructed area of 165,400 sq ft. It has separate dormitories for men and women. The ladies' hostel is located within the campus.

Management 
The college is managed by the Sree Narayana Gurukulam Trust, a registered charitable society comprising personalities from diverse spheres in Kerala. The functioning of the institution is steered by the Sree Narayana Gurukulam Trust. The members of the trust hail from various professional fields. The College has been approved by the All-India Council for Technical Education (AICTE) , New Delhi and it is affiliated to Mahatma Gandhi University and APJ Abdul Kalam Technological University, Kerala.

Departments and facilities

Post Graduate Programmes
 Master of Computer Applications (2 Year Regular)
 Master of Business Administration (Regular)

The college offers MTech in eight courses: 
 Computer Science And Engineering (CSE)
 Cyber Security
 Machine Designing
 Power Electronics
 Computer Aided Structural Engineering
 Structural Engineering And Construction Management
Vlsi And Embedded System
 Communication Engineering

Undergraduate Programmes
Naval Architecture and Ship Building Engineering (NASB)
Electronics and Communication Engineering (ECE)
Electrical and Electronics Engineering (EEE)
Computer Science and Engineering (CSE)
Mechanical Engineering (ME)
Civil Engineering (CE)
Master of Computer Applications (MCA Regular - 2 years)

Naval Architecture and Ship Building 
Established in the academic year 2013-14, the Department offers BTech program in Naval Architecture & Ship Building Engineering. SNGCE is the only college in the self-financing sector that offers course "BTech in Naval Architecture and Ship Building Engineering". The department offers BTech in Naval Architecture and Ship building is tied up with Department of Ocean Engineering, Indian Institute of Technology, Madras for utilizing some of the lab facilities. The first batch of students will graduate in 2017.

Library 

The library in SNGCE has over 15,847 volumes. It has spacious reading room, reference section, journal section, periodical section and CD ROM-based information systems.

Computer laboratories 

The college has eleven computer labs:
 Programming Lab
 Data structures Lab
 Database Lab
 System software Lab
 Computer Hardware and networking Lab
 Network Programming Lab
 Graphics and Multimedia Lab
 Internet Lab
 CAD Lab
 Linux Lab
 Data Centre

Naval Architecture and ship building Engineering 
 Welding Lab : TIG, MIG, SAW, MAW
 Ship Design Lab 
 Fire Control Lab
 CAM Lab
 Naval Architecture also has access to the laboratories of mechanical engineering department.

Electronics and Communication Engineering 

 Basic Electronics Lab
 Communications Lab I
 Electronics Circuit Lab
 Micro Processor Lab
 Computer programming Lab
 Systems Lab
 Communications Lab II
 Linear IC Lab
 Digital Lab

Electrical Electronics Engineering 

 Basic Electrical Lab
 Computer Programming Lab
 Electrical Machines Lab
 Electrical Measurements Lab
 Hydraulic Machines Lab
 Heat Engines Lab
 Electronic Circuit Lab
 Control Systems Lab
 Power Electronics Lab
 Electrical Engineering Workshop

Mechanical Engineering 
 Mechanical Workshop - Smithy Fitting Foundry and Carpentry
 Heat Engines Lab
 Electrical & Electronics Lab
 Computer Lab
 Hydraulic Machines Lab
 Fluid Mechanics Lab
 Mechanical Engineering Lab
 CNC Lab

Civil Engineering 

 Survey Lab
 Concrete Lab
 Material Testing Lab
 Computing Testing Lab
 Hydraulics Lab

See also
 List of Engineering Colleges in Kerala
 Sree Narayana Guru
 Sree Narayana Guru College of Advanced Studies, Nattika
 SCMS School of Engineering and Technology
 Toc H Institute of Science and Technology
 Adi Shankara Institute of Engineering Technology

References

External links 

Engineering colleges in Kochi
Sree Narayana College, Kollam
2002 establishments in Kerala
Educational institutions established in 2002